George Firestone (May 13, 1931 – March 2, 2012) was an American politician and businessman from the U.S. state of Florida. A Democrat, He served as the 20th Florida Secretary of State from 1979 to 1987.

Early life 
Firestone was born in New York City in 1931. He moved to Miami, Florida with his family as a child in 1936. Firestone served in the United States Army and was honorably discharged in 1952.

Career 
After leaving the Army, Firestone returned to Miami, where he established a security firm and cleaning business.

Firestone was elected to the Florida House of Representatives from Dade and Monroe counties in 1966. He was elected to the Florida Senate in 1972, where he served until 1978. He was elected Secretary of State of Florida in 1978 and was reelected twice, serving until he resigned in 1987.

He used the Secretary of State's position as chief cultural officer to promoted the arts, He also helped update the Florida seal to include the sabal palm. During his tenure, he also traveled a great deal to promote foreign investment in Florida, and was a supporter for Free Trade Zones in the state.

Personal life 
Later in life, he was diagnosed with Alzheimer's disease. On March 2, 2012, he died in a Hollywood, Florida assisted living facility at the age of 80.

References

1931 births
2012 deaths
Democratic Party Florida state senators
Jewish American state legislators in Florida
Democratic Party members of the Florida House of Representatives
Politicians from New York City
Secretaries of State of Florida
United States Army soldiers
Politicians from Miami
Deaths from dementia in Florida
Deaths from Alzheimer's disease
20th-century American politicians
21st-century American Jews